The Henrico County Board of Supervisors, is the governing body of Henrico County, Virginia; a county in the Greater Richmond Region. The board has five districts. Members may serve unlimited number of four-year terms, as there are no term limits.

The Board usually meets on the third Tuesday every month in the Public Meeting Room at the Henrico County Government Complex near Henrico, Virginia.  Members of the public are invited to attend these meetings.

Republicans currently control the Board holding three of the five seats. Democrats control two seats on the Board.

Members

See also 
 Board of supervisors

References

External links 
Board of Supervisors

Board of Supervisors
County government in Virginia